Nether Wallop is a village and civil parish in the Test Valley district of Hampshire, England.

Nether Wallop is the easternmost of the three villages collectively known as The Wallops, the other two being Over Wallop and Middle Wallop. The name "Wallop" derives from the Old English words  and hop, which taken together roughly mean "the valley of springing water".

The village was the site of the Battle of Guoloph that took place around AD 440. The element 'Wallop' is first attested in the Domesday Book of 1086 as 'Wallope', while Nether Wallop is first attested as 'Wollop inferior' c. 1270 in Episcopal Registers.

Nether Wallop contains many old thatched cottages, and has been featured in books and TV programmes as one of the prettiest villages in England. In particular, Dane Cottage in Five Bells Lane was used as Miss Marple's home in the village of St. Mary Mead for the BBC TV adaptations of the Agatha Christie novels. The house and many of the surrounding lanes within the village were used as the setting and are commonly seen throughout many of the Miss Marple films.

Sir Richard Reade (1511–1575), Lord Chancellor of Ireland, was a native of Nether Wallop, where his family were Lords of the Manor for several generations.

The conductor Leopold Stokowski died at his home in Nether Wallop on 13 September 1977.

The church of St Andrew is partly Anglo-Saxon, and unique fragments of frescoes apparently dating to the late Anglo-Saxon period have been discovered.<ref>[https://books.google.com/books?id=xO6FyEgYfpkC&pg=PA128&lpg=PA128&dq=%22Early+medieval%22+Irish+%22wall+painting%22&source=web&ots=NaU_Hberkz&sig=CpP7FiazNGfOgI1l_Xs61jereSw&hl=en&sa=X&oi=book_result&resnum=3&ct=result#PPA134,M1 Richard Gem and Pamela Tudor-Craig in Anglo-Saxon England]</ref>

For more than 200 years one of the two village pubs, The Five Bells, was a place to meet, eat and enjoy alcohol. For a few it was the centre of the village; a social hub along with the uniquely quaint village hall.  Over the last two decades it has had a number of tenants and managers who were unable to make a success of the business. It finally closed in 2013 when the most recent tenant surrendered his lease early citing a lack of local support for the pub. The Nether Wallop Parish Council had it listed as a Community Asset that year. Whilst it remains closed the village has formed a Community Benefit Society, and sufficient pledged finance, to buy it at its current market value, but have so far failed to provide the owners with evidence of the availability of the funds for their proposed purchase .

Further reading
 Richard Sawyer Saint Andrew's Church, Nether Wallop, Hampshire: Its Historical Development, Wall Paintings and Monuments'' pub. Saint Andrew's Church, Nether Wallop, Parochial Church Council, 1985

References

External links
 Youtube - 1984 LWT documentary chronicling the First International Nether Wallop Arts Festival. 

Villages in Hampshire